Orfű is a village in Baranya county, Hungary. The settlement is a well-known pleasure resort.

External links 

 Street map 
 Page of Orfű village 

Populated places in Baranya County